Marvin René (born 11 April 1995) is a French sprinter. He competed in the men's 4 × 100 metres relay at the 2016 Summer Olympics.

References

External links 
 
 

1995 births
Living people
French male sprinters
French Guianan athletes
Olympic athletes of France
Athletes (track and field) at the 2016 Summer Olympics
Sportspeople from Cayenne